A student information  system (SIS), student management system, school administration software or student administration system is a management information system for education sector establishments used to manage student data. It integrates students, parents, teachers and the administration. Student information systems provide capabilities for registering students in courses; documenting grading, transcripts of academic achievement and co-curricular activities, and the results of student assessment scores; forming student schedules; tracking student attendance; generating reports and managing other student-related data needs in an educational institution.

Information security is a concern, as universities house an array of sensitive personal information, making them potentially attractive targets for security breaches, such as those experienced by retail corporations or healthcare providers.

See also 
 Automate the Schools
Learning Management System
Sampoorna, school management system project implemented by the Education Department of the Government of Kerala, India

References 

School-administration software
Educational technology
Learning
Educational software
Information systems